Dye destruction or dye bleach is a photographic printing process, in which dyes embedded in the paper are bleached (destroyed) in processing. Because the dyes are fully formed in the paper prior to processing, they may be formulated with few constraints, compared to the complex dye couplers that must react in chromogenic processing. This method has allowed the use of richly colored, highly stable dyes.
It is a reversal process, meaning that it is used in printing transparencies (diapositives).

Ilfochrome (originally Cibachrome) is currently the only widely available dye destruction process, and is known for its intense colors and archival qualities.
Older dye destruction processes included Utocolor (early 1900s) and Gasparcolor (1930s). Plastic base supports have a "high gloss surface sheen".

References 

Photographic processes